(Fantastical Symphony: Episode in the Life of an Artist … in Five Sections) Op. 14, is a program symphony written by the French composer Hector Berlioz in 1830. It is an important piece of the early Romantic period. The first performance was at the Paris Conservatoire on 5 December 1830. Franz Liszt made a piano transcription of the symphony in 1833 (S. 470).

The American composer and conductor Leonard Bernstein described the symphony as the first musical expedition into psychedelia because of its hallucinatory and dream-like nature, and because history suggests Berlioz composed at least a portion of it under the influence of opium. According to Bernstein, "Berlioz tells it like it is. You take a trip, you wind up screaming at your own funeral."

Berlioz put a great deal of emotion into the piece, exploring the extremities of the emotional spectrum. He wanted people to understand his intentions behind it as they were the driving factor behind each movement and the story he attaches to the different parts of the piece. Berlioz said "For this reason I generally find it extremely painful to hear my works conducted by someone other than myself."

In 1831 Berlioz wrote a lesser-known sequel to the work, Lélio, for actor, soloists, chorus, piano and orchestra.

Overview 
 is a piece of program music that tells the story of an artist gifted with a lively imagination who has poisoned himself with opium in the depths of despair because of hopeless, unrequited love. Berlioz provided his own preface and program notes for each movement of the work. They exist in two principal versions – one from 1845 in the first score of the work and the second from 1855. From the revised preface and notes, it can be seen how Berlioz, later in his life, downplayed the programmatic aspect of the work.

In the first score from 1845, he writes:

In the 1855 preface, a different outlook towards the work's programmatic undertones is established by Berlioz:

Inspiration 
After attending a performance of William Shakespeare's Hamlet on 11 September 1827, Berlioz fell in love with the Irish actress Harriet Smithson, who had played the role of Ophelia. He sent her numerous love letters, all of which went unanswered. When she left Paris in 1829, they had still not met. Berlioz then wrote Symphonie fantastique as a way to express his unrequited love. There are many different portrayals of Harriet Smithson throughout the symphony. For example, the harsh narrative in the last two movements can be attributed to her rejection of him during this period of the composition. Smithson did not attend the premiere in 1830, but she heard the work in 1832 and realized Berlioz's genius. The two finally met and were married on 3 October 1833. However, their marriage became increasingly bitter, and they eventually separated after years of unhappiness.

Instrumentation 
The score calls for an orchestra of about 90 musicians:

Woodwinds

4 bassoons

Brass
4 horns
2 cornets
2 trumpets
3 trombones

Percussion
4 timpani (played by four players)

cymbals
snare drum (used in movement IV)
bass drum
bells in C and G

Strings
2 harps (used in movement II)

violins I, II
violas
celli
double basses

Berlioz specified at least 15 1st violins, 15 2nd violins, 10 violas, 11 celli and 9 basses on the score.

Berlioz originally wrote for one serpent and one ophicleide, but quickly switched to two ophicleides after the serpent proved to be difficult to use.

Each of the 5 movements had a different make-up. Not all instruments are used in each movement. Berlioz was one of the first to employ such a huge orchestra, and his successors continue this trend.

Berlioz also brings unique instrumentation and playing techniques into the piece. The piece was one of the earliest symphonies where the English horn played a large role. He includes an imitative duet between an off-stage oboe and the English horn. Berlioz also utilizes col legno bowing for the strings, a technique used very infrequently by major composers during his career.

Movements 
The symphony has five movements, instead of four as was conventional for symphonies of the time:

Each movement depicts an episode in the protagonist's life that is described by Berlioz in the program notes to the 1845 score. These program notes are quoted in each section below.

I. "Rêveries – Passions" (Daydreams – Passions)

The first movement is radical in its harmonic outline, building a vast arch back to the home key; while similar to the sonata form of the classical period, Parisian critics regarded this as unconventional. It is here that the listener is introduced to the theme of the artist's beloved, or the idée fixe. The idée fixe begins:

Throughout the movement there is a simplicity in the way melodies and themes are presented, which Robert Schumann likened to Beethoven's epigrams' ideas that could be extended had the composer chosen to. In part, it is because Berlioz rejected writing the more symmetrical melodies then in academic fashion, and instead looked for melodies that were "so intense in every note as to defy normal harmonization", as Schumann put it. The theme itself was taken from Berlioz's scène lyrique "Herminie", composed in 1828.

II. "Un bal" (A ball)

It begins with a mysterious introduction that creates an atmosphere of impending excitement, followed by a passage dominated by two harps; then the flowing waltz theme appears, derived from the idée fixe at first, then transforming it. More formal statements of the idée fixe twice interrupt the waltz.

The movement is the only one to feature the two harps, providing the glamour and sensual richness of the ball, and may also symbolize the object of the young man's affection. Berlioz wrote extensively in his memoirs of his trials and tribulations in having this symphony performed, due to a lack of capable harpists and harps, especially in Germany.

Another feature of this movement is that Berlioz added a part for solo cornet to his autograph score, although it was not included in the score published in his lifetime. The work has most often been played and recorded without the solo cornet part. However, conductors Jean Martinon, Colin Davis, Otto Klemperer, Gustavo Dudamel, John Eliot Gardiner, Charles Mackerras, Jos van Immerseel and Leonard Slatkin have employed this part for cornet in performances of the symphony.

III. "Scène aux champs" (Scene in the country)

The two shepherds mentioned in the program notes are depicted by a cor anglais (English horn) and an offstage oboe tossing an evocative melody back and forth. After the cor anglais–oboe conversation, the principal theme of the movement appears on solo flute and violins. It begins with:

Berlioz salvaged this theme from his abandoned Messe solennelle. The idée fixe returns in the middle of the movement, played by oboe and flute. The sound of distant thunder at the end of the movement is a striking passage for four timpani.

IV. "Marche au supplice" (March to the scaffold)

Berlioz claimed to have written the fourth movement in a single night, reconstructing music from an unfinished project, the opera Les francs-juges. The movement begins with timpani sextuplets in thirds, for which he directs: "The first quaver of each half-bar is to be played with two drumsticks, and the other five with the right hand drumsticks". The movement proceeds as a march filled with blaring horns and rushing passages, and scurrying figures that later show up in the last movement.

Before the musical depiction of his execution, there is a brief, nostalgic recollection of the idée fixe in a solo clarinet, as though representing the last conscious thought of the soon-to-be-executed man.

V. "Songe d'une nuit du sabbat" (Dream of a Night of the Sabbath)

This movement can be divided into sections according to tempo changes:

 The introduction is Largo, in common time, creating an ominous quality through the copious use of diminished seventh chords  dynamic variations and instrumental effects, particularly in the strings (tremolos, pizzicato, sforzando).
The return of the idée fixe as a "vulgar dance tune" is depicted by the B clarinet. This is interrupted by an Allegro Assai section in cut time at bar 29.
The E clarinet contributes a brighter timbre than the B clarinet.
 At bar 80, there is one bar of alla breve, with descending crotchets in unison through the entire orchestra.
The "Dies irae" begins at bar 127, the motif derived from the 13th-century Latin sequence. It is initially stated in unison between the unusual combination of four bassoons and two ophicleides. The key, C minor, allows the bassoons to render the theme at the bottom of their range.

 At bar 222, the "witches' round dance" motif is repeatedly stated in the strings, to be interrupted by three syncopated notes in the brass. This leads into the Ronde du Sabbat (Sabbath Round) at bar 241, where the motif is finally expressed in full.
 The Dies irae et Ronde du Sabbat Ensemble section is at bar 414.

There are a host of effects, including trilling in the woodwinds and col legno in the strings. The climactic finale combines the somber Dies Irae melody, now in A minor, with the fugue of the Ronde du Sabbat, building to a modulation into E major, then chromatically into C major, ending on a C chord.

References

Sources
 Holoman, D. Kern, Berlioz (Cambridge, Massachusetts: Harvard University Press, 1989). .
 Oxford Companion to Music, Oxford University Press, 2002. .
 Wright, Craig, "The Essential Listening to Music" (Schirmer, Cengage Learning 2013). .

External links

Symphonie fantastique on the Hector Berlioz Website, with links to Scorch full score and program note written by the composer.
 
Keeping Score: Berlioz Symphonie fantastique, multimedia website with interactive score produced by the San Francisco Symphony
 European Archive. A copyright-free LP recording of the Symphonie fantastique by Willem van Otterloo (conductor) and the Berlin Philharmonic Orchestra at the European Archive
 Beyond the Score. A concert-hall dramatized documentary and performance with the Chicago Symphony Orchestra
Symphonie fantastique at the Internet Archive, performed by the Cleveland Orchestra, Artur Rodzinski conducting
Complete performance of the symphony by the London Symphony Orchestra accompanied by visual illustrations of the symphony's programme

1830 compositions
Compositions by Hector Berlioz
Compositions that use extended techniques
Music dedicated to nobility or royalty
Berlioz, Symphonie Fantastique
Works about opium